To protect Japan's cultural heritage, the country's government selects through the Agency for Cultural Affairs important items and designates them as Cultural Properties under the Law for the Protection of Cultural Properties. This category includes historic locations such as shell mounds, ancient tombs, sites of palaces, sites of forts or castles, monumental dwelling houses and other sites of high historical or scientific value; gardens, bridges, gorges, mountains, and other places of great scenic beauty; and natural features such as animals, plants, and geological or mineral formations of high scientific value.

As of December 17, 2022 there are 1,038 Natural Monuments, 1881 Historic Sites, 427 Places of Scenic Beauty, 75 Special Natural Monuments, 36 Special Places of Scenic Beauty and 63 Special Historic Sites.

Since a single item can fall under more than one of these categories, the total number of sites is less than the sum of designations.

Criteria
The Agency for Cultural Affairs designates monuments based on a number of criteria. A monument can be designated based on more than one of these criteria:

Places of Scenic Beauty and Special Places of Scenic Beauty

 Parks and gardens
 Bridges and embankments
 Flowering trees, flowering grass, autumn colors, green trees and other places of dense growth
 Places inhabited by birds and wild animals, fish/insects and others
 Rocks, caves
 Ravines, gorges, waterfalls, mountain streams, abysses
 Lakes, marshes, wetlands, floating islands, springs
 Sand dunes, spits, seasides, islands
 Volcanoes, onsen
 Mountains, hills, plateaus, plains, rivers
 Viewpoints

Historic Sites and Special Historic Sites
 Shell mounds, settlement ruins, kofun, other historic ruins of this type
 Ruins of fortified towns, castles, government administration offices, old battlefields and other historic ruins related to politics or government
 Remains of shrines and temples, former compound grounds and other historic ruins related to religion
 Schools, research institutions, cultural facilities and other historic ruins related to education, learning or culture
 Medical care and welfare facilities, life related institution, other society and life related historic ruins
 Transport and communication facilities, forest conservation and flood control facilities, manufacture facilities and other historic sites related to finance or manufacture activities
 Graves and stone monuments with inscriptions
 Former residences, gardens, ponds and other areas of particular historical significance
 Ruins related to foreign countries or foreigners

Natural Monuments and Special Natural Monuments
 Animals
 Well-known animals peculiar to Japan and their habitat
 Animals which are not peculiar to Japan, but need to be preserved as well-known characteristic Japanese animals, and their habitat
 Animals or animal groups peculiar to Japan within their natural environment
 Domestic animals peculiar to Japan
 Well-known imported animals presently in a wild state, with the exception of domestic animals; their habitat
 Particularly valuable animal specimen
 Plants, vegetation
 Old trees of historic interest, gigantic trees, old trees, deformed trees, cultivated pulpwood, roadside trees, shrine forests
 Representative primeval forests, rare forest flora
 Representative alpine plants, special clusters of plants on rock ground
 Representative clusters of waste land plants
 Representative examples of coastal and sand ground vegetation
 Representative examples of areas of peat forming plants
 Clusters of plants growing in caves or grottoes
 Rare water plants in garden ponds, onsen, lakes, marshes, streams, sea, etc.; algae, moss, microbes, etc.
 Remarkable occurrence of epiphytic plants on rocks, trees or shrubs
 Remarkable plant growth on marginal land
 Remarkable growth in the wild of crop plants
 Wild habitat of rare or near extinct plants
 Geological and mineralogical features
 Rocks, mineral and fossil producing sites
 Conformable and unconformable strata
 Fold and thrust strata
 Geological features caused by the work of living creatures
 Phenomena related to earthquake dislocation and landmass motion
 Caves, grottoes
 Examples of rock organization
 Onsen and their sediments
 Erosion and weathering related phenomena
 Fumaroles and other items related to volcanic activity
 Ice and frost related phenomena
 Particularly precious rock, mineral and fossil specimen
 Representative territories rich in natural monuments to be protected (Natural Protected Areas)

Usage
The table's columns (except for Remarks and Photo) are sortable pressing the arrows symbols. The following gives an overview of what is included in the table and how the sorting works.
 Name: name of the monument as registered in the Database of Cultural Properties
 Special Place of Scenic Beauty: criteria under which the monument has been designated or "-" if it is not a Special Place of Scenic Beauty
 Special Historic Site: criteria under which the monument has been designated or "-" if it is not a Special Historic Site
 Special Natural Monument: criteria under which the monument has been designated or "-" if it is not a Special Natural Monument
 Remarks: general remarks
 Location: "town-name prefecture-name" and geo coordinates of the monument if applicable
 sorts as "prefecture-name town-name"
 Photo: picture of the monument

Special Places of Scenic Beauty, Special Historic Sites, Special Natural Monuments

References

External links

Japan history-related lists
Lists of tourist attractions in Japan